Yvo Nahuel Calleros Rébori (born 14 March 1998) is a Uruguayan footballer who plays as a midfielder for The Strongest in the Primera División Boliviana.

References

External links
 
 
 
 
 

1998 births
Living people
Plaza Colonia players
Uruguayan Segunda División players
Uruguayan footballers
Association football midfielders